Alfonso Buonocore (born 11 March 1933 in Naples) is an Italian freestyle swimmer and water polo player who competed in the 1952 Summer Olympics and in the 1956 Summer Olympics.

In 1952 he was eliminated in the first round of the 100 metre freestyle competition.

Four years later he was a member of the Italian water polo team which finished fourth in the Olympic tournament. He played five matches.

See also
 Italian record progression 200 metres freestyle

External links
profile

1933 births
Living people
Swimmers from Naples
Italian male swimmers
Italian male water polo players
Olympic swimmers of Italy
Olympic water polo players of Italy
Swimmers at the 1952 Summer Olympics
Water polo players at the 1956 Summer Olympics
Mediterranean Games bronze medalists for Italy
Swimmers at the 1955 Mediterranean Games
Mediterranean Games medalists in swimming
20th-century Italian people